John Hawley may refer to:
John Hawley (died 1408), MP for Dartmouth, mayor and alleged pirate, called the elder, father of the below
John Hawley (died 1436), MP for Dartmouth (UK Parliament constituency), called the younger, son of the above
John Hawley (priest), Archdeacon of Blackburn
John Hawley (footballer), English footballer
John B. Hawley, U.S. Representative from Illinois
John F. Hawley, American astrophysicist and professor of astronomy
Jack Hawley, American politician from Idaho